Robert "Robbie" Holland (born September 10, 1957) is a Canadian former professional ice hockey goaltender.

Early life and education 
Holland was born in Montreal. As a youth, he played in the 1970 Quebec International Pee-Wee Hockey Tournament with a minor ice hockey team from Ville-Émard.

Career 
Holland was selected by the Montreal Canadiens in the fourth round (64th overall) of the 1977 NHL amateur draft. He played 44 games in the National Hockey League with the Pittsburgh Penguins.

References

External links 

1957 births
Living people
Anglophone Quebec people
Binghamton Whalers players
Canadian ice hockey goaltenders
Ice hockey people from Montreal
Milwaukee Admirals (IHL) players
Montreal Canadiens draft picks
Montreal Juniors players
Nova Scotia Voyageurs players
Pittsburgh Penguins players
Springfield Indians players
Indianapolis Checkers players
Indianapolis Checkers (CHL) players